Messier 100 (also known as NGC 4321) is a grand design intermediate spiral galaxy in the southern part of the mildly northern Coma Berenices. It is one of the brightest and largest galaxies in the Virgo Cluster and is approximately 55 million light-years from our galaxy, its diameter being 107,000 light years, and being about 60% as large. It was discovered by Pierre Méchain in 1781 and 29 days later seen again and entered by Charles Messier in his catalogue "of nebulae and star clusters".. It was one of the first spiral galaxies to be discovered, and was listed as one of fourteen spiral nebulae by Lord William Parsons of Rosse in 1850. NGC 4323 and NGC 4328 are satellite galaxies of M100; the former is connected with it by a bridge of luminous matter.

Early observations
After the discovery of M100 by Méchain, Charles Messier made observations of the galaxy depicting it as a nebula without a star. He pointed out that it was difficult to recognize the nebula because of its faintness. William Herschel was able to identify a bright cluster of stars within the "nebula" during his observations. His son John expanded the findings in 1833. With the advent of better telescopes, John Herschel was able to see a round, brighter galaxy; however, he also mentioned that it was barely visible through clouds. William Henry Smyth extended the studies of M100, detailing it as a pearly white nebula and pointing out diffuse spots.

Star formation
Messier 100 is considered a starburst galaxy with the strongest star formation activity concentrated in its center, within a ring – actually two tightly wound spiral arms attached to a small nuclear bar of radius: one thousand parsecs – where star formation has been taking place for at least 500 million years in separate bursts.

As usual on spiral galaxies of the Virgo Cluster, in the rest of the disk both star formation and neutral hydrogen, of which M100 is deficient compared to isolated spiral galaxies of similar Hubble type, are truncated within the galaxy's disk, which is caused by interactions with the intracluster medium of Virgo.

Supernovae
Seven supernovae have been identified in M100.
 In March 1901 the first was found, SN 1901B, a type I supernova found with a magnitude of 15.6 at 110"W and 4"N from its nucleus.
 SN 1914A was then discovered in February to March 1914; its type was undeterminable but was found with a magnitude of 15.7 at 24"E and 111"S from its nucleus.
 Galactic observation from early to mid 1960 found SN 1959E, another type I supernova, with the faintest magnitude, 17.5, among the five found, at 58"E and 21"S from its nucleus.
 On April 15, 1979, the first type II supernova found in the M100 galaxy was discovered; however the star SN 1979C faded quickly; later observations from x-ray to radio wavelengths revealed its remnant.
 The fifth supernova was discovered February 7, 2006; the star SN 2006X had a magnitude of 15.3 when discovered two weeks before fading to magnitude +17.
 Supernova SN 2019ehk, discovered on April 29, 2019, reached a peak magnitude of approximately 15.8. 
 The seventh supernova, SN 2020oi, was discovered on January 7, 2020. It was type Ic supernova, which reached a peak magnitude of 17.7.

Gallery

See also
 List of Messier objects

References and footnotes

External links

 SEDS: Spiral Galaxy 100
 
 ESA/Hubble Messier 100
 NASA Astronomy Picture of the Day

 
Intermediate spiral galaxies
Coma Berenices
100
Messier 100
17810413
Virgo Cluster
Discoveries by Pierre Méchain